Farinha may refer to:
Farinha, cassava flour as used in Brazilian cuisine
Farinha River, Brazil
Basílio Farinha (born 1977), Portuguese politician
Guilherme Farinha (born 1956), Portuguese football coach
Jonathan Farinha (born 1996), Trinidadian sprinter
Manuel Antônio Farinha (died 1842), Brazilian admiral

See also
Da Farinha River, Brazil
Farina (disambiguation)